Magnus Stuart (born 1952) is a Swedish politician. From February 2021 to September 2022, he served as Member of the Riksdag representing the constituency of Södermanland County. He became a member after Lotta Finstorp resigned.

References 

Living people
1952 births
Place of birth missing (living people)
Members of the Riksdag from the Moderate Party
Members of the Riksdag 2018–2022
21st-century Swedish politicians